Voznica is a village and municipality in the Žarnovica District, Banská Bystrica Region in Slovakia with a population of 640 in 2014. The village is located in the Hron valley.

History

The first written mention of the settlement is dated in 1075.

External links
https://web.archive.org/web/20080111223415/http://www.statistics.sk/mosmis/eng/run.html  
https://www.voznica.sk/obec-voznica/obyvatelstvo
https://www.voznica.sk/obec-voznica/historia

Villages and municipalities in Žarnovica District